Allodontidae (from ancient Greek "ἄλλος"  "ὀδούς", "different tooth") is a family of extinct multituberculate mammal that lived in what is now North America during the Upper Jurassic period. They were relatively early mammals and are within the informal suborder of "Plagiaulacida". The family was named by Othniel Charles Marsh in 1889. Two genera are recognized: Ctenacodon and Psalodon.

References 
 Kielan-Jaworowska Z & Hurum JH (2001), "Phylogeny and Systematics of multituberculate mammals". Paleontology 44, p. 389-429.
 Most of this information has been derived from  MESOZOIC MAMMALS: Basal Multituberculata, an Internet directory.

Multituberculates
Late Jurassic first appearances
Late Jurassic extinctions
Prehistoric mammal families